Kinigitos is a form of a Greek folk dance from Thrace, Greece.

See also
Music of Greece
Greek dances

References
Κυνηγητός xoρόs

Greek dances